Adelostomini is a tribe of darkling beetles in the subfamily Pimeliinae of the family Tenebrionidae. There are more than 30 genera in Adelostomini, found primarily in tropical Africa.

Genera
These genera belong to the tribe Adelostomini:

 Acanthioides Fairmaire, 1894  (tropical Africa)
 Acestophanus Koch, 1950  (tropical Africa)
 Adelostoma Duponchel, 1827  (the Palearctic and tropical Africa)
 Argasidus Péringuey, 1899  (tropical Africa)
 Arthrochora Gebien, 1938  (tropical Africa)
 Aspilomorpha Koch, 1952  (tropical Africa)
 Basilewskyum Koch, 1952  (tropical Africa)
 Brachymoschium Fairmaire, 1896  (tropical Africa)
 Carinosella Purchart, 2010  (tropical Africa)
 Cimicia Fairmaire, 1891  (tropical Africa)
 Cimicichora Koch, 1952  (tropical Africa)
 Cimiciopsis Koch, 1952  (tropical Africa)
 Eurychora Thunberg, 1789  (tropical Africa)
 Eurychorula Koch, 1952  (tropical Africa)
 Eutichus Haag-Rutenberg, 1875  (tropical Africa)
 Geophanus Haag-Rutenberg, 1875  (tropical Africa)
 Herpsis Haag-Rutenberg, 1875  (tropical Africa)
 Lepidochora Koch, 1952  (tropical Africa)
 Lycanthropa J. Thomson, 1860  (tropical Africa)
 Machlopsis Pomel, 1871  (the Palearctic and tropical Africa)
 Phytolostoma Koch, 1952  (tropical Africa)
 Platyphanus Koch, 1952  (tropical Africa)
 Platysemodes Strand, 1935  (tropical Africa)
 Pogonobasis Solier, 1837  (the Palearctic and tropical Africa)
 Pogonocanta Koch, 1952  (tropical Africa)
 Prunaspila Koch, 1950  (tropical Africa)
 Psaryphis Erichson, 1843  (tropical Africa)
 Serrichora Koch, 1952  (tropical Africa)
 Smiliophanus Koch, 1950  (tropical Africa)
 Steptochora Koch, 1952  (tropical Africa)
 Stips Koch, 1950  (tropical Africa)
 Stipsostoma Koch, 1952  (tropical Africa)
 Symphochora Koch, 1952  (tropical Africa)

References

Further reading

 
 

Tenebrionoidea